is a Japanese international rugby union player who plays as a flanker.

Club career

Born and raised in New Zealand, Ilaua came to Japan to attend Teikyo University.   Upon graduation he signed for the Toshiba Brave Lupus ahead of the 2016–17 Top League season.

International

After just 7 Top League appearances, Ilaua received his first call-up to Japan's senior squad ahead of the 2016 end-of-year rugby union internationals.

References

Living people
People from Auckland
Rugby union players from Auckland
Sportspeople from Auckland
Japanese rugby union players
New Zealand rugby union players
Japan international rugby union players
Rugby union flankers
Toshiba Brave Lupus Tokyo players
Teikyo University alumni
New Zealand expatriate sportspeople in Japan
1993 births
Sunwolves players
Counties Manukau rugby union players
Coca-Cola Red Sparks players
Shizuoka Blue Revs players